Adam Matthew Nagaitis (born 7 June 1985) is a British actor best known for his roles as Caulker's Mate Cornelius Hickey in the AMC television series The Terror and firefighter Vasily Ignatenko in the HBO miniseries Chernobyl. Nagaitis is a graduate of the Stella Adler Conservatory and the Royal Academy of Dramatic Art.

Early life
Adam Nagaitis was born in 1985 in Chorley, Lancashire to Barry Nagaitis, a quantity surveyor and chartered engineer, and Susan (née Doran), who subsequently divorced. He has an older sister, Kate. In 2002, his father died after being struck by a bus while shopping in Manchester.

At age 19 he left the UK to study acting at the Stella Adler Conservatory in New York, from which he graduated in 2007. Following this, he studied at the Royal Academy of Dramatic Art in London. He graduated from RADA with a BA in Acting in 2012.

Career
At the age of 14, he began his acting career in 2000 when he played a minor character in the television series Children's Ward.

In 2014, he appeared as Jimmy in Yann Demange's first feature film '71. He also appeared as Pete in The Inbetweeners 2 (2014).

In 2015, he appeared as Mr. Cummins in the period biographical film Suffragette and as Private Buckley in 7 episodes of the television series Banished.

In 2018, he appeared as Conductor Jimmy in the mystery action film The Commuter, featuring Liam Neeson, Vera Farmiga, Patrick Wilson and Sam Neill.

He starred as Caulker's Mate Cornelius Hickey in the 2018 AMC television series The Terror. He appeared as firefighter Vasily Ignatenko in the 2019 HBO miniseries Chernobyl.

In 2022, it was reported that Nagaitis had joined the cast of Daryl Dixon, the spinoff of The Walking Dead centered on Daryl Dixon.

Filmography

Film

Television

Radio

Advertising

References

External links 
 

Living people
Alumni of RADA
British male film actors
British male television actors
People from Chorley
Male actors from Lancashire
1985 births
21st-century British male actors
Stella Adler Studio of Acting alumni